The Tea and Sugar was the nickname for one of two dedicated Commonwealth Railways trains that were the sole source of provisions for the isolated settlements of the  Trans-Australian Railway between Port Augusta and Kalgoorlie.

History
The Tea and Sugar began in 1915 as a provision train for workers constructing the Trans-Australian Railway. They and their families depended on the train for every necessity since the rail link was the only form of transport into the region. When the railway was completed in 1917, settlements had been established along the route at which many railway operational, locomotive maintenance and track repair employees lived with their families, and there was a need to transport food, water and goods to them. This was achieved by two single-purpose weekly trains, the eastbound counterpart being known as "The Bomber". Sheep were brought on the train, which had its own butcher. There was a  car that allowed railway families to view the latest films (or at least, at the smaller stations, part of them) while the train was in the siding, and a welfare car staffed by a nurse. 

Each time the train crossed the Nullarbor Plain, it included carriages to suit the different needs of residents throughout the year. On some trains there was a bank car, which allowed residents to make financial transactions, and a post office car; and in December there was a Christmas car, with a much-anticipated Santa who brought presents.

Former railways commissioner Dr Ron Fitch, who was the engineer for the Trans-Australian Railway early in his career, observed that the Tea and Sugar was the "most over-glamorised train in Australia ... whose real claim to fame was that its start-to-stop average speed must have made it the slowest train in the world".

The train originally operated on a  journey from Port Augusta to Kalgoorlie. A 1985 timetable showed the westbound service leaving Port Augusta at 12:00 on Wednesday and arriving at Kalgoorlie at 14:15 on Saturday, with the eastbound service departing at 15:00 on Wednesday arriving at 18:55 on Friday. The schedule was later cut back to an  journey from Port Augusta to Cook.

The Tea and Sugar was withdrawn in August 1996. Some carriages have been preserved at the National Railway Museum, Port Adelaide.

References

Zwingle, Erla "The Tea & Sugar Train: Lifeline in Australia's Outback."  National Geographic, June 1986, pp. 737 – 757
 Chambers, T.F. "The Tea and Sugar" Australian Railway Historical Society Bulletin October 1962

External links
Film Australia: 1954 documentary on the Tea & Sugar
Flinders University – Tea & Sugar Train Archive
Comrails: A short history of the Tea & Sugar cars

Named passenger trains of Australia
Nullarbor Plain
Railway services introduced in 1917
Trans-Australian Railway
1917 establishments in Australia
1996 disestablishments in Australia
Railway services discontinued in 1996
Discontinued railway services in Australia